The governor of Davao Oriental is the executive head of the province of Davao Oriental. The inaugural holder of the post is Ponciano Bangoy.

List

References

Davao Oriental
Occidental Mindoro